Pseudacidalia is a genus of moths of the family Noctuidae. The genus was erected by George Hampson in 1894.

Species
Pseudacidalia albicosta (Moore, [1885]) Sri Lanka
Pseudacidalia fulvilinea Warren, 1913 Peninsular Malaysia
Pseudacidalia grisea Warren, 1913 New Guinea
Pseudacidalia undulata Hampson, 1894 Myanmar
Pseudacidalia unilineata Bethun-Baker, 1906 New Guinea

References

Acontiinae